The 1992 United States Senate election in Arizona was held on November 3. Incumbent Republican U.S. Senator John McCain won re-election to a second term.

Democratic primary

Candidates
 Claire Sargent, community activist
 Truman Spangrud, Air Force Lieutenant General

General election

Candidates
 Kiana Delamare (Libertarian)
 Ed Finkelstein (New Alliance)
 John McCain, incumbent U.S. Senator (Republican)
 Evan Mecham, former Governor and candidate for this seat in 1962 (Independent)
 Claire Sargent, community activist (Democratic)
 Robert B. Winn (Independent)

Results

See also
 1992 United States Senate elections

References

1992 Arizona elections
Arizona
1992
John McCain